The 1973 St Albans City and District Council election took place on 7 June 1973 to elect members of St Albans City and District Council in England. This was on the same day as other local elections.

This was the inaugural election of St Albans City and District Council.

Summary

|}

References

St Albans
St Albans City and District Council elections
1970s in Hertfordshire